Sequoiadendron is a genus of evergreen trees, with two species, only one of which survives to the present:

 Sequoiadendron giganteum, extant, commonly known as wellingtonia, giant redwood and giant sequoia, growing naturally in the Sierra Nevada of California
 † Sequoiadendron chaneyi, extinct, the predecessor of Sequoiadendron giganteum, found mostly in the Nevada part of the Tertiary Colorado Plateau until the late Miocene

Fossil record

Sequoiadendron fossil pollen and macrofossils may have been found as early as the Cretaceous and throughout the Northern Hemisphere, including locations in western Georgia in the Caucasus region.

References

 
Endemic flora of California
Conifer genera